Uran-Islampur  (Islampur''' for short) is a city and a Municipal Council in Sangli district in the Indian state of Maharashtra.

The 2011 Census of India recorded a total of 67,391 residents in the town.

References 

Cities and towns in Sangli district